Presidential elections were held in Djibouti on 9 April 1999. Following the retirement of Hassan Gouled Aptidon, who had served as President since independence in 1977, his nephew Ismail Omar Guelleh won the nomination of the ruling People's Rally for Progress. His only opponent was Ahmed-Idriss Moussa who ran as an independent, with the support of the National Democratic Party-Democratic Renewal Party coalition. The result was victory for Guelleh, who won 74% of the vote.

Results

References

Djibouti
President
Presidential elections in Djibouti
Djibouti
Election and referendum articles with incomplete results